Marie Zielcke (born 3 February 1979 in Cologne) is a German film, television and stage actress.

Mika Kaurismäki who directed Zielcke in the 2000 film Highway Society, introduced her to actor Henry Thomas in Berlin. Zielcke and Thomas had a daughter together in 2004, marrying that same year. By 2006, Zielcke had started a long-term relationship with actor Christoph Maria Herbst, and Thomas filed for divorce in 2007. Zielcke and Herbst remained together until 2009.

Selected filmography

References

External links

1979 births
21st-century German actresses
German film actresses
Living people
Actors from Cologne